Wong Tai Sin District Recreation & Sports Council (abbreviated as WTS DRSC, also known as Wong Tai Sin) is a football club which currently plays in the Hong Kong First Division League. It is operated by Wong Tai Sin District Council.

History
Founded in 1979, Wong Tai Sin joined the Third Division League in 1980s. In 1990, due to the expansion of Second Division League, the club was being promoted to the second-tier division.

In their first Second Division season, the club placed second in the league table, meaning they had gained promotion to the First Division for the first time in club history. However, they refused to promote eventually, and remained in the Second Division.

The club was relegated to the Third Division after spending nine seasons in the second-tier division in the 1998–99 season, as they placed 10th out of eleven teams.

In the 2013–14 season, the club finished 2nd in the Hong Kong Second Division League and gained promotion to the newly established Hong Kong Premier League. This became the club's first-ever appearance in the top-flight league of Hong Kong. 

In the 2015–16 season, the club was branded as Glory Sky Wong Tai Sin. However, the club was relegated from the HKPL after finishing 9th in the season.

WTS came close to winning the 2016–17 Hong Kong First Division title, coming within one point short of catching champions Sun Hei.

Honours

League
Hong Kong First Division
Runners-Up (1): 2016–17
Hong Kong Second Division
Runners-Up (1): 2013–14
Hong Kong Third Division
Champions (1): 2012–13

External links
 Wong Tai Sin District Recreation & Sports Council official website 
 Wong Tai Sin District Recreation & Sports Council official facebook page

Hong Kong First Division League
Association football clubs established in 1979
1979 establishments in Hong Kong